Lasiancistrus caucanus is a species of armored catfish native to Panama and Colombia.  This species grows to a length of  SL.

References
 

Ancistrini
Freshwater fish of Colombia
Fish of Panama
Taxa named by Carl H. Eigenmann
Fish described in 1912